Sofiya Oleksandrivna Nalepinska-Boychuk (Ukrainian: Софія Олександрівна Налепинська-Бойчук; 30 July 1884 Łódź — 11 December 1937, Kyiv)) was a Polish-born Ukrainian artist, now largely known for her woodcuts.

Biography 
She was born in Poland. Her father was a railway engineer and her mother was a pianist. In 1890, her father was transferred to St.Petersburg and she received her first art lessons from the Polish painter, Jan Ciągliński. Later, she took private lessons in Munich, from the Hungarian painter, Simon Hollósy. She completed her studies in 1909 in Paris, at the Académie Ranson, where she worked with Félix Vallotton and Maurice Denis. While there, she met the Ukrainian artist, Mykhailo Boychuk. After a tour of Italy with him and a friend, she returned to Galicia and became involved in the local art community.

She did, however, maintain contact with Boychuk and, in 1917, they were married in Kyiv. She learned Ukrainian and assimilated the culture quickly. They had a son in 1918. From 1919 to 1922, she worked at an art school in Mirgorod, then became head of the xylography workshop at the Kyiv Institute of Plastic Arts (after 1924, the Kyiv Art Institute, now the National Academy of Visual Arts and Architecture). She was there until 1929.

In 1936, she and her husband were arrested on charges of espionage and counterrevolutionary activities. The following year, they were executed by firing squad; in December and July, respectively.

During the Ukrainian War of Independence, she created designs for paper money and government securities. They were exhibited in 1932, but were never used.

In 1988, she was rehabilitated.

References

Further reading 
 M.F. Dmitryenko; Налепинська-Бойчук Софія Олександрівна
 Serhii Bilokin; Смерть Софії Налепінської-Бойчук

External links

 Biography @ ArtHive
 Photograph and brief biography @ the Ukrainian Art Library
 "The Students of Mykhailo Boychuk" @ The Day

1884 births
1937 deaths
Artists from Łódź
People from Piotrków Governorate
Ukrainian artists
Woodcut cutters
Executed Ukrainian women
Great Purge victims from Poland
Polish emigrants to Ukraine